Bret v JS & Wife (1600) Cro Eliz 756 is a formative English contract law, which held that a good consideration for courts to enforce contracts did not include promises for "natural affection".

Facts
Mr William Dracot was the husband of the wife in this case. His son went to "table" (train as a servant for meal preparation) with Mr Bret for three years. Dracot promised Bret £8 a year for the duration, but he died that same year. The widow, out of love for the son and the wish that the son would continue, promised Bret £6 13s 4d for the tabling of the son for the rest of the three years, and £8 a year for each year after. Then the widow married the defendant, J.S. Mr Bret brought an action for the £6 13s 4d for tabling in the two years following.

The report shows the counsel for JS and the wife, Warburton, argued (1) this was an entire contract by the first husband for the entire year and it could not be apportioned (2) natural affection is not a sufficient ground for an assumpsit without quid pro quo (3) the contract should have been pleaded as an action for debt.

Judgment
The Court held that the action succeeded. The report runs as follows,

See also
Pillans v Van Mierop
White v Bluett
Combe v Combe
Williams v Roffey Bros

Notes

English enforceability case law
English consideration case law
1600 in law
1600 in English law
Court of Common Pleas (England) cases